Behnam Barzay (born 11 February 1993) is an Iranian footballer who currently plays for Gol Gohar Sirjan in the Persian Gulf Pro League.

Career
He played his entire career in Sanat Naft for three seasons. In June 2013, he was moved to Rah Ahan after Sanat Naft's relegation.

Esteghlal
On 1 February 2015, he joined to Esteghlal on a two-and-a-half-year contract.

His good performances in the 2014–15 season drew the attention of La Liga club Getafe CF who were interested to sign him.

In June 2017, he left the club after his contract ran out. However, with the appointment of Winfried Schäfer as the new Esteghlal manager, he signed a new two and half year contract with the club on 5 November 2017, allowing him to play from January 2018.

Club career statistics

Assists

International career

U20
He was part of Iran U–20 during 2012 AFC U-19 Championship qualification, 2012 CIS Cup, 2012 AFF U-19 Youth Championship and 2012 AFC U-19 Championship.

U23
He invited to Iran U-23 training camp by Nelo Vingada to preparation for Incheon 2014 and 2016 AFC U-22 Championship (Summer Olympic qualification).

Honours

Club
Esteghlal
Hazfi Cup: 2017–18

References

1993 births
Living people
Iranian footballers
Sanat Naft Abadan F.C. players
Rah Ahan players
Esteghlal F.C. players
People from Behbahan
Iran under-20 international footballers
Association football forwards
Gol Gohar players
Sportspeople from Khuzestan province